Football was contested for men only at the 1991 Summer Universiade in Sheffield, United Kingdom.

References
 Universiade football medalists on HickokSports

U
1991 Summer Universiade
Football at the Summer Universiade
1991